The Republic of Karelia, also known as just Karelia, is a republic of Russia situated in Northwest Russia. Its capital is Petrozavodsk.

The modern Karelian Republic was founded as an autonomous republic within the Russian SFSR by the Resolution of the Presidium of the All-Russian Central Executive Committee (VTsIK) on 27 June 1923 and by the Decree of the VTsIK and the Council of People's Commissars of 25 July 1923, from the Karelian Labour Commune. From 1940 to 1956, it was known as the Karelo-Finnish Soviet Socialist Republic, one of the republics of the Soviet Union. In 1956, it was once again made an autonomous republic and remained part of Russia following the dissolution of the Soviet Union in 1991.

Etymology 
"Karelia" derives from the name of the ethnic group—Karelians. The name "Karjala" has unknown origins, however, it is theorised that it may come from the Proto-Finnish word karja, meaning "herd", which was borrowed from the Proto-Germanic harjaz ("army"); the ending -la means "earth".

Geography
The republic is in the northwestern part of Russia, between the White and Baltic Seas. It shares internal borders with Murmansk Oblast (north), Arkhangelsk Oblast (east/south-east), Vologda Oblast (south-east/south), and Leningrad Oblast (south/south-west), and it also borders Finland (Kainuu, Lapland, North Karelia, Northern Ostrobothnia, and South Karelia); the borders measure 723 km. The main bodies of water next to Karelia are the White Sea (an inlet of the Barents Sea) to the north-east and Lake Onega and Lake Ladoga both shared with neighboring Oblasts to the south.

Geology
As a part of the Fennoscandian Shield's ancient Karelian craton, most of the Republic of Karelia's surficial geology is Archaean or Paleoproterozoic, dated up to 3.4 billion years in the Vodlozero block. This area is the largest contiguous Archaean outcrop in Europe and one of the largest in the world.

Since deglaciation, the rate of post-glacial rebound in the Republic of Karelia has varied. Since the White Sea connected to the World's oceans uplift along the southern coast of Kandalaksha Gulf has totaled 90 m. In the interval 9,500–5,000 years ago the uplift rate was 9–13 mm/yr. Before the Atlantic period, uplift rate had decreased to 5–5.5 mm/yr, to then rise briefly before arriving at the present uplift rate is 4 mm/yr.

Rivers
There are about 27,000 rivers in Karelia.   Major rivers include:
 Vodla River (Vodlajoki, 149 km)
 Kem River (Kemijoki, 191 km)
 Kovda River (Koutajoki)
 Shuya River (Šuojogi)
 Suna River (Suunujoki) with Kivach Falls (Kivatšun vesiputous)
 Vyg River (Uikujoki)

Lakes

There are 60,000 lakes in Karelia. The republic's lakes and swamps contain about 2,000 km³ of high-quality fresh water.  Lake Ladoga (Finnish: Laatokka) and Lake Onega (Ääninen) are the largest lakes in Europe.  Other lakes include:
 Nyukozero (Nuokkijärvi)
 Pyaozero (Pääjärvi)
 Segozero (Seesjärvi)
 Syamozero (Säämäjärvi)
 Topozero (Tuoppajärvi)
 Vygozero (Uikujärvi)

The lakes Ladoga and Onega are located in the south of the republic.

Islands
White Sea coast:
 Oleniy Island
 Chernetskiye Island
 Kamestrov Island
 Kuzova Archipelago
 Shuy Island
 Kutulda Island
 Perkhludy Island
 Lesnaya Osinka Island
 Kotkano Island
 Vygnvolok Island
 Tumishche Island
 Sum Island
 Razostrov Island
 Sedostrov Island
 Myagostrov Island
 Zhuzhmuy Islands
 Kondostrov Island

In Lake Onega:
 Bolshoy Klimenetsky Island

In Lake Ladoga:
 Vossinoysari Island
 Valaam Island
 Mantsinsaari Island
 Lunkulansaari Island

National parks

 Vodlozero National Park
 Kalevala National Park
 Paanajärvi National Park

Natural resources
The majority of the republic's territory (or 85%) is composed of state forest stock. The total growing stock of timber resources in the forests of all categories and ages is 807 million m³. The mature and over-mature tree stock amounts to 411.8 million m³, of which 375.2 million m³ is coniferous.

Fifty useful minerals are found in Karelia, located in more than 400 deposits and ore-bearing layers.  Natural resources of the republic include iron ore, diamonds, vanadium, molybdenum, and others.

Climate
The Republic of Karelia is located in the Atlantic continental climate zone. Average annual precipitation is 500–700 mm.

Administrative divisions
Administrative and territorial division:16 districts (including 3 national districts), 2 city okrugs. 21 urban settlements, 85 rural settlements (including 3 Vepsian rural settlements).

History

Middle ages 

The Karelian people and culture developed during the Viking Age in the region to the west of Lake Ladoga. Karelians were first mentioned in Swedish sagas around the 10th century. Russians first mentioned Karelians in 1143, they called Karelians "Korela".

Sweden's interest in Karelia began a centuries-long struggle with Novgorod (later Russia) that resulted in numerous border changes following the many wars fought between the two, the most famous of which is the Pillage of Sigtuna of 1187. In 1137 the oldest documented settlement was established, the modern-day city of Olonets (Aunus). Karelians converted to Orthodox Christianity in 1227. The Karelians' alliance with Novgorod developed into domination by the latter in the 13th century, when Karelia became a part of Novgorod under the name of Obonezhie pyatina as an autonomy. Later Karelia had anti-Novgorod revolts in the 13th and 14th centuries.

Later Karelia became a part of Muscovy when Novgorod was annexed in the second half of the 15th century.

During the Great Northern War (1700–1712) the modern-day capital of Karelia, the city of Petrozavodsk was founded as a cannon factory by Peter the Great.

19th century 
On September 9(21) 1801 Olonets Governorate was created by order of Alexander I.

Early 20th century 

In 1906 the Union of White Sea Karelians (Vienan karjalaisten liito) was created; it advocated for equal rights for minorities and democratization. It stopped existing in 1911 after its leaders were deported to Siberia. It later influenced Karelian intelligentsia which led to the creation of the Uhtua Republic.

In 1918 White Karelia declared independence from Russia, creating the Uhtua Republic. In 1920 Finnish forces in the south occupied Olonets, creating a puppet government, which was crushed by the Red Army in the same year. The Republic of Uhtua was crushed in December 1920.

Soviet Karelia 

On June 8, 1920 Karelian Labour Commune was created. In 1921 an insurrection was started as a last attempt to restore the Uhtua Republic, but it was crushed by the Red Army, many Karelian, Finnish, and some Russian families left for Finland with only some returning to Soviet Karelia, they were later repressed under Stalin. In 1923, the KLC became the Karelian Autonomous Soviet Socialist Republic (Karelian ASSR).

In the 1930s Finnish communists, who fled to Karelia, were purged. People of Finnish and Karelian nationality were also subject to repressions. Despite being 3% of the population, over 41% of all repressed in Karelia were Finns, 27% were Karelian, and 25% were Russian. Karelia has one of the biggest burial sites of Stalinist purges in Russia – Sandarmoh, where possibly thousands of victims were executed.

Winter War 

During the Winter War, a Soviet puppet government was created in occupied territories. The Finnish Democratic Republic was to incorporate most of Finland's pre-war territories plus some western parts of the KASSR. Some members of the FDP government were also members of the KASSR government.

After the Moscow Peace Treaty territories of the Karelian Isthmus were transferred to the newly created Karelo-Finnish Soviet Socialist Republic. After the evacuation of Finnish Karelia, the new territories were left unpopulated, so migrants from Belarus, Ukraine, Russia, and other Soviet republics moved in. To this day, this area has one of the lowest percentages of Karelian and Finnish populations in the Republic.

World War II 
After the beginning of the Great Patriotic war, mass rallies were held on the territory of the republic, at which the inhabitants of Karelia declared their readiness to stand up for the defense of the Soviet Union. Workers of the Onega Tractor Plant wrote “We will work only in such a way as to fully meet the needs of our Red Army. We will double, triple our forces and crush, destroy the German fascists".

On 24 June 1941, after the German army crossed Zapadnaya Dvina, Finnish president Risto Ryti announced declaration of war on the Soviet Union. The Finnish army crossed the Soviet border on 1 July.

Soon after the evacuation of border regions began, On July 3, a republican evacuation commission was created. At its first meeting, it was decided to evacuate children under 14 out of Petrozavodsk. The same decision also refers to the evacuation of 150 families of leading party and Soviet workers in Karelia. Those residents who could work had to remain in the harvest and defense work.

By September the Finnish army already reached Petrozavodsk and captured Olonets. Petrozavodsk offensive began on 20 September. To protect the city, the 7th Army under the command of General K.A. Meretskov was directly subordinated to the Headquarters of the Supreme Commander.

On September 30, the position of the defenders of the city deteriorated sharply. The Finnish army managed to break through Soviet defenses and cut the highway to Kondopoga in the area of the Sulazhgorsky brick factory. In the south Finns came close to the city outskirts. On October 1, due to the threat of encirclement, an order was received from the command to withdraw the main units defending the city.

The fighting near Petrozavodsk allowed the authorities to evacuate most of the civilian population and a significant part of the production capacities. In total, more than 500 thousand people were evacuated from the republic to the east. Petrozavodsk University was temporarily relocated to Syktyvkar.

After the capture of Petrozavodsk, the capital of Soviet Karelia was transferred first to Medvezhyegorsk, then to Belomorsk. Less than 90 thousand people remained in the occupied territory, half of which are representatives of the Finno-Ugric peoples: Karelians, Vepsians, and Finns. The Finnish administration has officially recognized them as a "kindred" population. The rest received the status of "unrelated" people. Most of them have been put into concentration camps, along with communists and people who could not speak Finnish or karelian.

Former prisoners of the camps recalled that the staff often treated them more harshly than was supposed to according to the instructions. According to them, the Finns in the presence of children shot prisoners, and beat women, children, and the elderly. One of the prisoners told the Finnish historian Helga Seppel that before leaving Petrozavodsk, the invaders shot several young people for unknown reasons.

During the occupation, Petrozavodsk was renamed to Äänislinna.

Only a few territories of the KFSSR managed to escape the Finnish occupation: the Belomorsky, Loukhsky, Kemsky, Pudozhsky regions, as well as part of the Medvezhiegorsky, Tungudsky and Ukhta regions. By 1942, about 70 thousand people lived here.

After the end of the Siege of Leningrad Soviet army was ordered to liberate Karelia.

On 21 June 1944 Svir-Petrozavodsk operation started. On 27 June the Finnish army left Petrozavodsk. By August the Soviet army reached pre-war borders.

Post-war 

After the end of World War II, the Karelian Isthmus was incorporated into the Leningrad Oblast and the city of Alakurtti was transferred to Murmansk Oblast.

After normalization of diplomatic relations between USSR and Finland the status of the Karelo-Finnish SSR was changed back to the Karelian ASSR in 1956. After this Karelian, Veps, and Finnish languages began a decline in usage due to the lack of any support from the state and lack of education.

The transformation of the KFSSR into the Karelian ASSR was supposed to show that the USSR did not have aggressive goals against Finland.

In 1978 Korean airlines Boeing 707-321B was shot down over Murmansk oblast and landed near Louhi.

Present-day 

In August 1990 KASSR declared its sovereignty as an autonomous part of the Russian Federation, and later changed its name to the Republic of Karelia in 1991.

In 2004 Veps National Volost was transferred to Prionezhsky District.

In 2006 a racial conflict and later riot started in Kondopoga after a fight between locals and Caucasian immigrants led to 2 deaths. This caused an exodus of Muslims from Karelia.

In 2011 a plane crashed near the village of Besovets killing 47 people.

Politics

The highest executive authority in the Republic of Karelia is the Head of the Republic. The acting Head of the Republic is Artur Parfenchikov, who was elected in February 2017 and later re-elected in 2022.

The parliament of the Republic of Karelia is the Legislative Assembly comprising fifty deputies elected for a four-year term.

The Constitution of the Republic of Karelia was adopted on 12 February 2001.

Demographics
Population:

Settlements

Vital statistics

Ethnic groups
According to the 2021 Census, ethnic Russians make up 86.4% of the republic's population, ethnic Karelians 5.5%. Other groups include Belarusians (2.0%), Ukrainians (1.2%), Finns (0.7%), Vepsians (0.5%), and a host of smaller groups, each accounting for less than 0.5% of the total population.

Languages

Currently Russian is the only official language of the republic. Karelian, Veps, and Finnish have been officially recognized languages of the republic since 2004, and they are de jure supported by the government. In early 2000s Karelian and Veps language nests were created in Petrozavodsk, Kalevala, Tuksa and Sheltozero, but were later shut down. Now native languages of Karelia have little support from the government. 

Finnish was the second official language of Karelia from the creation of the Karelian Labour Commune up until the dissolution of the Soviet Union. Thereafter there were suggestions to raise Karelian as the second official language, but they were repeatedly turned down.

Religion

The Karelians have traditionally been Eastern Orthodox. Lutheranism was brought to Karelia during Sweden's conquest of Karelia and was common in regions that then belonged to Finland. Nowadays Lutherans can be found in most big settlements but they remain a minority.

Catholics have one parish in Petrozavodsk.

The Petrozavodsk Jewish Religious Community was registered in 1997.

Karelian Muslims were organized into Karelian muftiate in 2001.

According to a 2012 survey, 27% of the population of Karelia adheres to the Russian Orthodox Church, 2% are unaffiliated Christians, and 1% are members of Protestant churches. In addition, 44% of the population declared to be "spiritual but not religious", 18% is atheist, and 8% follow other religions or did not answer the question.

Economy

Karelia's economy is based on forestry, mining, tourism, agriculture, fishing and the paper industry.

Despite being 0,4% of Russia's population, 65–70% of all Russian trout is grown in the Republic, 26% of iron ore pellets, 20% of paper, 12% of wood pulp and cellulose.

Karelia's gross regional product (GRP) in 2007 was 109.5 billion rubles. The Karelian economy's GRP in 2010 was estimated at 127733.8 million rubles. Karelia's GRP in 2021 was 176 billion rubles. This amounts to 291,841 rubles per capita, which is lower than national average.

The largest companies in the region include Karelsky Okatysh ($ of revenue in 2021), Segezha Pulp and Paper Mill ($ of revenue in 2021), OAO Kondopoga ($ of revenue in 2021).

In the structure of the gross regional product in 2017, the main types of economic activity were:mining – 17.6%; manufacturing industries – 16.9%; transportation and storage – 11.8%; wholesale and retail trade; repair of motor vehicles and motorcycles – 9.8%; public administration and military security; social security – 8.7%.

A fast fiber-optic cable link connecting Finnish Kuhmo and Karelian Kostomuksha was built in 2007, providing fast telecommunications.

Industry

Forestry 

The forest and wood processing sector dominates industrial activity in Karelia. A large number of small enterprises carry out timber logging whereas pulp and paper production is concentrated in five large enterprises, which produce about a quarter of Russia's total output of paper. Three largest companies in the pulp and paper sector in 2021 were: OAO Kondopoga (sales of $), Segezha Pulp and Paper Mill ($) and RK-Grand (Pitkäranta Pulp Factory) ($).

The timber industry complex of Karelia produces 28% of the republic's industrial output.

Mining 

Karelia is a region with a lot of natural resources, from gold to metals.

In 2007, extractive industries (including extraction of metal ores) amounted to 30% of the republic's industrial output. There are about 53 mining companies in Karelia, employing more than 10,000 people. One of the most important companies in the sector is AO Karelian Pellet, which is the 5th largest of Russia's 25 mining and ore dressing enterprises involved in ore extraction and iron ore concentrate production. Other large companies in the sector were OAO Karelnerud, Mosavtorod State Unitary Enterprise, and Pitkjaranta Mining Directorate State Unitary Enterprise.

Energy 

As of 2021, there were 29 powerplants, of them 21 were hydroplants and 8 thermal power plants.

Agriculture 
Due to Karelia's climate, only 1,2% of the land is used for farming. Most of the farmland is located on podzol.

20 agricultural organizations employing 2.3 thousand people. Animal husbandry is the leading branch of agriculture in the Republic, the main areas of which are dairy cattle breeding, pig breeding, broiler poultry farming, and fur farming.

Annually agricultural enterprises of the region produce up to 59 thousand tons of milk. Based on its natural and climatic conditions, the plant growing industry is focused on the production of feed for livestock, the bulk of potatoes and vegetables are grown in small forms of management.

Fishing 
Fishing enterprises of Karelia produced 91.9 thousand tons of aquatic biological resources in 2021.

In the Barents Sea and the Atlantic Ocean, 89.9 thousand tons of aquatic biological resources were caught, of them 34.6 thousand tons of cod and haddock, 34.1 thousand tons of blue whiting, 18 thousand tons of mackerel and 1.1 thousand tons of northern shrimp. 306 tons of fish were caught in the White Sea and 612 tons of kelp and fucus were harvested. The catch of freshwater fish amounted to 1.1 thousand tons.

Tourism 

Karelia is popular for international and domestic tourism.

Traditional, active, cultural and ecological types of tourism are popular among tourists.

Karelia attracts ecotourists with its nature and wilderness and low population density. During the summer water tourism is also popular among many tourists.

Cultural tourism is also a big part of Karelia's tourism economy. The region attracts many tourists with its wooden architecture, local culture, and traditions.

Karelia also has the first Russian health resort – Martial Waters (1719).

Foreign trade
The economy of Karelia is export-orientated. By the volume of exports per capita, Karelia is among the leading regions of Russia. More than 50% of manufactured products (and up to 100% in several industries) are exported.

The Republic's main export partners in 2001 were Finland (32% of total exports), Germany (7%), Netherlands (7%), and the United Kingdom (6%). Main export products were lumber (over 50%), iron ore pellets (13–15%) paper and cardboard (6–9%) and sawn timber with (5–7%). Many of Karelia's companies have received investments from Finland.

Transportation

Railroad

Karelia is a strategically important railroad region due to the fact that it connects Murmansk with the rest of Russia by Kirov Railway, which was electrified in 2005.

There are also railways connections with Finland in Värtsilä and Kostomuksha, but they are not electrified.

All Karelian district capitals are connected by railroad, except for the Kalevalsky district and Prionezhsky district.

In total, Karelia has 1915 km of railways.

Water communications 

Water communications connect Karelia with the Barents, Baltic, Black, White and Caspian Seas.

Whitea sea-Baltic Canal was built in the 1930s to connect the Baltic and White seas. The 227 km long canal was built by the prisoners. Even though it has 19 locks, the canal cannot pass vessels with a draft of more than 5 meters. The canal is a part of the Volgo-Baltic Waterway.

There are also river ports on the coast of the White Sea, there were plans to upgrade them to ocean ports but they were deemed too expensive.

Highways 
Automobile highway R-21 "Kola" crosses Karelia and connects Murmansk Region and Murmansk seaport with St. Petersburg and Moscow.

E105 European highway also goes through Karelia.

Other highways connect with Finland in Louhsky district Värtsilä and Kostomuksha.

Many of Karelian roads are still unimproved.

Air transportation 

Petrozavodsk Airport is the only working airport in Karelia as of 2022.

There are other airports, such as Kalevala or Kostomuksha, but they are not used or used by firefighters.

Culture

Karelia is very culturally diverse region that was influenced by Finno-Ugric, Slavic and Scandinavian cultures.

Literature 

Karelia is sometimes called "the songlands", as Karelian poems constitute most of the Karelo-Finnish epic Kalevala and many of Russian Bylinas were documented in Pudozh.

The written literature of Karelia was formed at the beginning of the 20th century. In the 1930s Karelian and Veps languages gained a writing system, but during the Stalinist repressions many books in veps and Karelian were burned and cultural figures were deported.

After the creation of the Karelian Labour Commune many American and Canadian finns moved to Karelia and began creating new literature. Many Karelians could understand Finnish so some authors, such as one of the most famous Karelian writers Antti Timonen, started to write in Finnish.

Art 
Karelian art history begun with Petroglyphs, which were created around 6,500 years ago. They became a UNESCO World Heritage Site, listed in 2021.

Icon painters were the first professional artists of Karelia.

Karelia has become a source of inspiration for many famous artists of the 19th–20th century such as: Ivan Shishkin, Arkhip Kuindzhi, and N. K. Roerich.

Architecture 

Karelia is famous for its wooden architecture. Karelian architecture developed under the strong influence of Novgorod architecture. Examples of Karelian architecture are collected in the Kizhi Pogost Museum.

Later Karelian architecture was influenced by Finns, especially after the creation of the Karelian Labour Commune.

Music 
Kantele is the most famous traditional Karelian musical instrument. In Kalevala the mage Väinämöinen makes the first kantele from the jawbone of a giant pike and a few hairs from Hiisi's stallion.

In 1939, the Symphony Orchestra of the Karelo-Finnish State Philharmonic was founded.

Throughout the years, many Karelian, Russian, Veps, Finnish and Pomor choirs were created, such as the Karelian choir "Oma pajo" in 1990, which is still active.

Museums 

 State Historical, Architectural and Ethnographic Museum-Reserve "Kizhi"
 National Museum of the Republic of Karelia (including Sheltozero Veps Ethnographic Museum, Museum "Marcial Waters" and Museum of the Karelian Front in Belomorsk)
 "Valaam Research, Church-Archaeological and Natural Museum-Reserve"
 Museum of Fine Arts of the Republic of Karelia
 Museum of the History of Public Education of the Republic of Karelia

Theaters 

 Musical Theater of the Republic of Karelia
 National Theater of the Republic of Karelia
 State Puppet Theater of the Republic of Karelia
 Drama Theater of the Republic of Karelia "Creative Workshop"
 Non-state author's theater "Ad Liberum"

Theater companies 

 Čičiliusku, a puppet theatre company

Holidays 
Along with Russian holidays, Karelia has its official public holidays as well as unofficial holidays.

Official

Unofficial

Religious

Cultural

See also 
 Karelian Isthmus
 Music of Karelia
 Sami music
 Pegrema

Notes

References

Sources

External links

  Official website of the Republic of Karelia
  Karelia.ru web server
  Heninen.net – various information about Karelia
 Information about Karelians
 Tracing Finland's eastern border-thisisFINLAND
 Saimaa Canal links two Karelias-thisisFINLAND
 ProKarelia (also available in other languages)

 
Russian-speaking countries and territories
States and territories established in 1991
1991 establishments in Russia
Fennoscandia
Republics